Edward Vesala (15 February 1945 – 4 December 1999), born Martti Vesala, was a Finnish avant-garde jazz drummer.

Career

Born in Mäntyharju, he began playing jazz and rock in the 1960s, in such bands as Blues Section and Apollo. In the 1970s, he led his own jazz groups, a quartet with Polish trumpet player Tomasz Stańko and sax player Tomasz Szukalski, played with Toto Blanke's Electric Circus, and recorded with Norwegian saxophonist Jan Garbarek. In the 1980s and 1990s, Vesala recorded several albums of his own compositions that combined jazz, classical music, tango, and folk music with his own group Sound & Fury, an ensemble of about ten players made up mostly of Vesala's students. Prominent players in Sound and Fury included saxophonists Jorma Tapio and Pepa Päivinen, guitarists Raoul Björkenheim and Jimi Sumén, and harpist and keyboardist Iro Haarla, who was Vesala's wife.

Vesala died from congestive heart failure in Yläne, Finland at the age of 54.

Discography

As leader
 Nan Madol (ECM, 1974)
 Satu (ECM, 1977)
 Heavy Life (Leo, 1980)
 Lumi (ECM, 1986)
 Ode to the Death of Jazz (ECM, 1989)
 Invisible Storm (ECM, 1991)
 Nordic Gallery (ECM, 1994)

As sideman
With Jan Garbarek
 Triptykon (ECM, 1973)

With Tomasz Stańko
 TWET (Polish Jazz vol. 39) (Polskie Nagrania Muza, 1974)
 Balladyna (ECM, 1976)
 Live at Remont (Helicon, 1976)
 Almost Green (Leo, 1978)

With Kenny Wheeler
 Around 6 (ECM, 1979)

References

External links
[ Allmusic Guide biography of Edward Vesala] by Chris Kelsey
Eetu – 12 sessiota Edward Vesalan kanssa Documentary film on Vesala and his work with Sound and Fury by Markus Viljanen (1994)
Jazzhouse

1945 births
1999 deaths
People from Mäntyharju
20th-century conductors (music)
20th-century drummers
20th-century male musicians
ECM Records artists
Finnish conductors (music)
Finnish jazz drummers
Finnish jazz musicians
Finnish male composers
Male jazz musicians
20th-century Finnish composers